Dian may refer to:

Places
 Dian Kingdom, ancient kingdom in modern Yunnan province, China
 Diān (滇), an official abbreviation for Yunnan province
 Lake Dian, a lake in Yunnan
 Dian, Armenia, a village

People
 Dian (given name), a list
 Dian (surname), a list

See also
 Diane (disambiguation), a given name
 Dianne (disambiguation), a given name